is a history museum in Tsuzuki-ku, Yokohama, Kanagawa, Japan.
Its exhibition focuses on the history of the city of Yokohama.

See also
Yokohama Archives of History

External links

Yokohama History Museum

Museums in Yokohama
History museums in Japan